The Twentieth Legislature of the Territory of Hawaii was a session of the Hawaii Territorial Legislature.  The session convened in Honolulu, Hawaii, and ran from February 15 until April 26, 1939.

Legislative session
The session ran from February 15 until April 26, 1939. It passed 264 bills into law.

Senators

House of Representatives

References

Notes

Hawaii legislative sessions
1939 in Hawaii